Martins Ferry is a former settlement in Klamath County and later in Humboldt County, California. It lay on the Klamath River, at an elevation of 315 feet (96 m). It still appeared on maps as of 1983.

History
A post office operated at Martins Ferry from 1861 to 1862 and from 1865 to 1891. There was a military fort at the place in the 1860s. The name honors John F. Martin, its first postmaster, who also operated a ferry.

References

Settlements formerly in Klamath County, California
Former settlements in Humboldt County, California
Former populated places in California
1861 establishments in California